MasterChef Ukraine is a Ukrainian competitive reality television cooking show based on the revival USA version of MasterChef. The first episode aired on 31 August 2011 on STB.

Judges
The competition judges are Canadian-Colombian chef Hector Jimenez-Bravo, Ukrainian сulinary expert Olha Martynovska and Ukrainian 
chef Vladimir Yaroslavskiy.

Seasons

MasterChef

MasterChef Junior

MasterChef Teens

MasterChef: The Professionals

MasterChef: Celebrity

Returns

Contestants

MasterChef

Season 1: 2011

Season 2: 2012

Season 3: 2013

Season 4: 2014

Season 5: 2015

Season 6: 2016

Season 7: 2017

Season 8: 2018

Season 9: 2019

Season 10: 2020

Season 11: 2021

MasterChef All Stars

MasterChef: The Professionals

Season 1: 2019

Season 2: 2020

External links
Official Website (in Ukrainian)

References

Ukraine
Ukrainian cooking television series
2011 Ukrainian television series debuts
STB (TV channel) original programming